Gang Dong-won (born January 18, 1981) is a South Korean actor.

Early life 
Gang Dong-won was born January 18, 1981, in Busan, and grew up in Changwon of Gyeongsangnam-do. His father, Gang Cheol-woo, was an engineer and later vice president of SPP Heavy Industries. Gang's family suffered economic hardship at times and Gang had to work part-time in college to pay for his tuition. Academically gifted with an IQ of 137, Gang graduated from Hanyang University at Ansan with a degree in mechanical engineering.

Career

2000–2004: Beginnings 
In 2000, when Gang was a first year university student, he was spotted on the street by a modeling agent. Thus began his modeling career, and he appeared on the catwalk for prêt-à-porter collections in Paris such as DKNY, Gucci and Hugo Boss, as well as for the local Seoul Fashion Artists Association (SFAA).

After being cast in the music video for Jo Sung-mo's "I Swear," Gang began taking acting classes, leading to a change in career. He made his acting debut on television in 2003, playing a doctor with a regional dialect in Country Princess (also known as Funny Wild Girl), and a chaebol's son in Something About 1%. In 2004 he shot his first movie, the romantic comedy Too Beautiful to Lie, which was moderately successful.

2005–2010: Career breakthrough and mainstream success 
Gang's first real breakthrough was in Temptation of Wolves, the film adaptation of Guiyeoni's teen internet novel. Gang's popularity subsequently rose, extending to other Asian countries, especially Japan. He then briefly returned to television as an antihero in Magic, though it received low ratings.

Gang's next roles were an inmate on death row in Maundy Thursday, and the antagonist in Voice of a Murderer. His two collaborations with auteur Lee Myung-se in Duelist and M further cemented Gang's status as one of the top young actors in Korean cinema, earning him critical recognition for his stylish flair and diverse choice of roles.

Gang said that he decided to play the mischievous titular character in the action fantasy Jeon Woo-chi: The Taoist Wizard because "he wanted to work on a fun movie, as he was emotionally drained while formerly having worked on several serious films. The Choi Dong-hoon film turned into a holiday blockbuster, selling over 6 million tickets over the winter season despite opening in theaters only a week after the release of Avatar in Korea. In 2010, he was cast opposite veteran actor Song Kang-ho in Jang Hoon's spy film Secret Reunion. It became one of the biggest Korean box office hits of 2010, with over 5 million tickets sold. He then joined the Busan-centered omnibus Camellia, starring in Jang Joon-hwan's short film Love For Sale. Gang's last project before enlistment was the psychic thriller Haunters.

2010–2012: Military service 
Gang enlisted for his mandatory military service on November 18, 2010, for four weeks of basic training at the Nonsan military camp in South Chungcheong Province. This was followed by non-active duty as a public service worker at Seoul City Research Institute of Public Health and Environment. He was discharged on November 12, 2012. On the day of his release, his agency uploaded a three minutes YouTube clip of him in various locations throughout the city, titled "Gang Dong-won in a Day."

2013–present: Return to acting 
In 2013, Gang appeared in The X, a 30-minute spy thriller directed by Kim Jee-woon.

In 2014, Gang returned to the big screen in Yoon Jong-bin's period action film Kundo: Age of the Rampant, playing an illegitimate nobleman's son who attempts to destroy a group of Robin Hood-like outlaws in 19th century Joseon Dynasty. He next starred in My Brilliant Life, E J-yong's film adaptation of Kim Aeran's bestselling novel My Palpitating Life about a couple who must watch their son suffering from progeria grow prematurely old.

In 2015, Gang reunited with Jeon Woo-chi co-star Kim Yoon-seok in Jang Jae-hyun's mystery thriller The Priests.

In 2016, Gang played a young con artist in the crime film A Violent Prosecutor directed by Lee Il-hyung, which became the second highest grossing Korean film of 2016. He also starred in Um Tae-hwa's fantasy film Vanishing Time: A Boy Who Returned and Cho Ui-seok's financial thriller film Master together with Lee Byung-hun and Kim Woo-bin. After ending the contract with United Artist Agency, Gang signed with a new agency, YG Entertainment in January 2016.

In 2017, Gang made a special appearance as Yi Han-yeol in Jang Joon-hwan's historical film 1987: When the Day Comes.

In 2018, Gang played a delivery man framed for the assassination of a politician in Noh Dong-seok's thriller Golden Slumber, based on Isaka Kotaro's novel of the same name. His next project was Kim Jee-woon's science fiction action thriller Illang: The Wolf Brigade, which is a film adaption based on Jin-Roh: The Wolf Brigade, a Japanese animated thriller. 

In 2020, Gang starred in the Yeon Sang-ho's horror-action-thriller Peninsula, a standalone sequel to 2016 hit Train to Busan. He then starred in the Hirokazu Kore-eda's film Broker where he played the role of Dong-soo–a man who was abandoned by parents, and now sells abandoned babies with his friend played by Song Kang-ho. The film competed for Palme d'Or at 2022 Cannes Film Festival.

In December 2022, Gang ended his contract with YG Entertainment after about 7 years.

Controversy 
In March 2017, a user of movie website Max Movie uploaded a list of currently active movie actors who are descendants of pro-Japanese collaborators, and listed Gang. His maternal great-grandfather Lee Jong-man (1885–1977) is listed in the pro-Japanese biographical dictionary, having been involved in mining business during the Japanese colonial rule and donating to the Japanese army. Because of the revelation, Gang issued a public apology, and cancelled his scheduled recording for Vanishing Time: A Boy Who Returned commentary.

Endorsements 
In May 2022, Gang was selected as House ambassador for French luxury brand Louis Vuitton.

Filmography

Film

Television series

Music video appearances

Discography

Awards and nominations

Listicles

References

External links 

 
 
 
 Gang Dong-won Japan Official Fanclub
 Gang Dong-won at Naver Movie
 Gang Dong-won at Daum Movie

Male actors from Busan
South Korean male film actors
South Korean male television actors
South Korean male models
Hanyang University alumni
1981 births
Living people
21st-century South Korean male actors